Doris Trueman (born 23 May 1953) is a British cross-country skier. She competed in three events at the 1984 Winter Olympics.

References

External links
 

1953 births
Living people
British female cross-country skiers
Olympic cross-country skiers of Great Britain
Cross-country skiers at the 1984 Winter Olympics
Sportspeople from Aberdeen